Afrosoricida is an order of placental mammals. Members of this order are called afrosoricids, and include golden moles, otter shrews, and tenrecs. They are found in Africa, generally in forests, but also inland wetlands, shrublands, and grasslands. They range in size from the least shrew tenrec, at  plus a  tail, to the giant otter shrew, at  plus a  tail. Afrosoricids primarily eat invertebrates, particularly insects and earthworms, though some will also eat small lizards or other vertebrates. The golden moles have vestigial eyes covered with skin, and track their prey through vibrations rather than sight. No population estimates have been made for any afrosoricid species, though the De Winton's golden mole is classified as Critically Endangered and the giant golden mole, Gunning's golden mole, Jenkins's shrew tenrec, Juliana's golden mole, Marley's golden mole, northern shrew tenrec, and Van Zyl's golden mole are categorized as endangered species.

The fifty-five extant species of Afrosoricida are divided into two suborders, with Chrysochloridea containing the family Chrysochloridae, or golden moles, and Tenrecomorpha containing the families Potamogalidae, or otter shrews, and Tenrecidae, or tenrecs. Chrysochloridae is split into the subfamilies Chrysochlorinae, containing eleven species in six genera, and Amblysominae, containing ten species in four genera. Potamogalidae consists of three species in two genera, while Tenrecidae contains the subfamilies of Geogalinae, comprising a single species, Oryzorictinae, containing twenty-five species in three genera, and Tenrecinae, containing five species in four genera. The order as a whole was traditionally grouped with the hedgehogs, shrews, and moles as part of the order Lipotyphla, but modern molecular phylogenetic analysis resulted in that order being split into Afrosoricida and Eulipotyphla. Few extinct Afrosoricida species have been discovered, though due to ongoing research and discoveries the exact number and categorization are not fixed.

Conventions

Conservation status codes listed follow the International Union for Conservation of Nature (IUCN) Red List of Threatened Species. Range maps are provided wherever possible; if a range map is not available, a description of the afrosoricid's range is provided. Ranges are based on the IUCN Red List for that species unless otherwise noted. All extinct species or subspecies listed alongside extant species went extinct after 1500 CE, and are indicated by a dagger symbol "".

Classification
The order Afrosoricida consists of two suborders, Chrysochloridea and Tenrecomorpha. Chrysochloridea consists of the family Chrysochloridae, or golden moles, and Tenrecomorpha contains the families Potamogalidae, or otter shrews, and Tenrecidae, or tenrecs. Chrysochloridae contains twenty-one species in ten genera, divided into two subfamilies. Potamogalidae consists of three species in two genera, while Tenrecidae contains thirty-one species in eight genera, divided into three subfamilies. Many of these species are further subdivided into subspecies. This does not include hybrid species or extinct prehistoric species.

Suborder Chrysochloridea
 Family Chrysochloridae
 Subfamily Chrysochlorinae
 Genus Carpitalpa (Arends' golden mole): one species
 Genus Chlorotalpa (golden moles): two species
 Genus Chrysochloris (golden moles): three species
 Genus Chrysospalax (golden moles): two species
 Genus Cryptochloris (golden moles): two species
 Genus Eremitalpa (Grant's golden mole): one species
 Subfamily Amblysominae
 Genus Amblysomus (narrow-headed golden moles): five species
 Genus Calcochloris (yellow golden mole): one species
 Genus Huetia (Central African golden moles): two species
 Genus Neamblysomus (golden moles): two species

Suborder Tenrecomorpha
 Family Potamogalidae
 Genus Micropotamogale (dwarf otter shrews): two species
 Genus Potamogale (giant otter shrew): one species
 Family Tenrecidae
 Subfamily Geogalinae
 Genus Geogale (large-eared tenrec): one species
 Subfamily Oryzorictinae
 Genus Microgale (shrew tenrecs): twenty-one species
 Genus Nesogale (shrew tenrecs): two species
 Genus Oryzorictes (rice tenrecs): two species
 Subfamily Tenrecinae
 Genus Echinops (lesser hedgehog tenrec): one species
 Genus Hemicentetes (streaked tenrecs): two species
 Genus Setifer (greater hedgehog tenrec): one species
 Genus Tenrec (tailless tenrec): one species

Afrosoricids
The following classification is based on the taxonomy described by the reference work Mammal Species of the World (2005), with augmentation by generally accepted proposals made since using molecular phylogenetic analysis, as supported by both the IUCN and the American Society of Mammalogists.

Suborder Chrysochloridea

Family Chrysochloridae

Subfamily Chrysochlorinae

Subfamily Amblysominae

Suborder Tenrecomorpha

Family Potamogalidae

Family Tenrecidae

Subfamily Geogalinae

Subfamily Oryzorictinae

Subfamily Tenrecinae

References

Sources
 
 
 
 

 
Afrosoricids
Afrosoricids